Prince Henry's Institute of Medical Research (PHI) was a Melbourne-based independent, not-for-profit, medical research institute based at the Monash Medical Centre in Victoria, Australia. In January 2014 it merged with the Monash Institute of Medical Research to become the Hudson Institute of Medical Research. Professor Bryan Hudson was the founding Director of Prince Henry’s Institute and founding Chair of the Department of Medicine at Monash University.

History
Originally established in 1960 as the Medical Research Centre at Prince Henry's Hospital in South Melbourne, the Institute moved from its St Kilda Road premises during the amalgamation of Prince Henry’s Hospital, Queen Victoria Memorial Hospital and Moorabbin Hospital to become the Monash Medical Centre in 1987.

The Institute’s name-sake originates from Prince Henry, Duke of Gloucester who served as the 11th Governor-General of Australia.

References

External links
Hudson Institute of Medical Research

Defunct medical research institutes in Australia
1960 establishments in Australia
2014 disestablishments in Australia